Contrastive may refer to one of several concepts in linguistics:

Contrast (linguistics)
Contrastive linguistics
Contrastive distribution
Contrastive analysis
Contrastive rhetoric
Contrastive focus reduplication
Contrastive stress
Contrastive wa; see Japanese grammar
Contrastive units, a basic unit of sound
Chroneme
Phoneme

See also
Contrast (disambiguation)